is a passenger railway station in the city of Nabari,  Mie Prefecture, Japan, operated by the private railway operator Kintetsu Railway.

Lines
Mihata Station is served by the Osaka Line, and is located 73.1 rail kilometers from the starting point of the line at Ōsaka Uehommachi Station.

Station layout
The station consists of two opposed side platforms, connected by an underground passage. The station is unattended and has  an automatic ticket gate using the PiTaPa Icoca system.

Platforms

Adjacent stations

History
Mihata Station opened on November 19, 1930 as a station on the Sangu Express Electric Railway. After merging with Osaka Electric Kido on March 15, 1941, the line became the Kansai Express Railway's Osaka Line. This line was merged with the Nankai Electric Railway on June 1, 1944 to form Kintetsu.

Passenger statistics
In fiscal 2019, the station was used by an average of 767 passengers daily (boarding passengers only).

Surrounding area
Mihata Kofun Cluster
Nabari Municipal Mihata Elementary School

See also
List of railway stations in Japan

References

External links

  

Railway stations in Japan opened in 1930
Railway stations in Mie Prefecture
Stations of Kintetsu Railway
Nabari, Mie